Irfan Ansari is an Indian politician and member of the Indian National Congress. Ansari is a member of the Jharkhand Legislative Assembly from the Jamtara constituency in Jamtara district in 2014 and 2019. His father Furqan Ansari was also a Member of Legislative assembly from Jamtara constituency of Jharkhand being an Indian National Congress candidate.

References 

People from Jamtara district
Indian National Congress politicians from Jharkhand
Members of the Jharkhand Legislative Assembly
Living people
Jharkhand MLAs 2014–2019
Jharkhand MLAs 2019–2024
Year of birth missing (living people)